Rosa Yaseen Hassan is a Syrian novelist and writer. She was born in Damascus in 1974 and studied architecture at university. Upon graduation in 1998, she worked as a journalist, writing for various Syrian and Arabic periodicals. Her first published book was a collection of short stories, published in 2000 under the title A Sky Tainted with Light. She has also written a number of novels, starting with Ebony (2004) which won the Hanna Mina Prize. Her third novel Hurras al-Hawa (Guardians of the Air, 2009) was longlisted for the Arabic Booker Prize.

In 2009, Hassan was chosen as one of the Beirut39, a group of 39 Arab writers under the age of 40 chosen through a contest organised by Banipal magazine and the Hay Festival.

References

External links

1974 births
Living people
Syrian women novelists
Syrian women journalists
Syrian women short story writers
Syrian short story writers
Writers from Damascus
20th-century novelists
20th-century women writers
20th-century short story writers
Syrian Alawites
20th-century Syrian women writers
20th-century Syrian writers
21st-century Syrian women writers
21st-century Syrian writers